The 1996 Mountain Dew Southern 500, the 47th running of the event, was a NASCAR Winston Cup Series race held on September 1, 1996 at Darlington Raceway in Darlington, South Carolina. Contested at 367 laps on the 1.366 mile (2.198 km) speedway, it was the 23rd race of the 1996 NASCAR Winston Cup Series season. Jeff Gordon of Hendrick Motorsports won the race.

Top 10 results

Race statistics
 Time of race: 3:41:34
 Average Speed: 
 Pole Speed: 170.934
 Cautions: 6 for 37 laps
 Margin of Victory: 5.23 sec
 Lead changes: 29
 Percent of race run under caution: 10.1%         
 Average green flag run: 47.1 laps

References

Mountain Dew Southern 500
Mountain Dew Southern 500
Mountain Dew Southern 500
NASCAR races at Darlington Raceway